Veisi is a Persian surname. Notable people with the surname include:

Abdollah Veisi (born 1971), Iranian footballer and coach
Kheyrollah Veisi (born 1988), Iranian footballer
Saman Veisi (born 1982), Iranian basketball player

Persian-language surnames